Janakpur Today (Nepali: जनकपुर टुडे) is a Nepali language national daily, published from Janakpurdham. It is owned by Janakpur Today Media Group. The chairman of the media group, Arun Singhaniya, was murdered in 2010, reportedly over content published by Janakpur Today.

References

External links
 

Daily newspapers published in Nepal
2010 establishments in Nepal
Nepali-language newspapers